The second season of the animated television series, Aqua Teen Hunger Force originally aired in the United States on Cartoon Network's late night programming block, Adult Swim. Season two started on May 25, 2003, with "Super Birthday Snake" and ended with "The Last One" on December 31, 2003, with a total of twenty four episodes. Aqua Teen Hunger Force is about the surreal adventures and antics of three anthropomorphic fast food items: Master Shake, Frylock, and Meatwad, who live together as roommates and frequently interact with their human next-door neighbor, Carl Brutananadilewski in a suburban neighborhood in South Jersey, New Jersey. In May 2015, this season became available on Hulu Plus.

With twenty four episodes, season two is the longest season of the series. Episodes in season two were written and directed by Dave Willis and Matt Maiellaro. Almost every episode in this season features a special guest appearance, including the season finale "The Last One" which features the return of several guests from the first two seasons, who have reprised their roles. This season has been made available on DVD, and other forms of home media, including on demand streaming.

Production
Every episode in this season was written and directed by series creators Dave Willis and Matt Maiellaro, who have both written and directed every episode of the series. All episodes originally aired in the United States on Cartoon Network's late night programming block, Adult Swim. This season was one of the original seasons branded under the Aqua Teen Hunger Force title before Willis and Maiellaro started using a different alternative title for each season in 2011. As with most seasons, several episodes originally aired outside of their production order.

With a total of twenty four episodes, Season Two is the longest season of Aqua Teen Hunger Force. The first ten episodes in Season Two (except for "The Meat Zone") feature the word "Super" in the title. Many episodes from this season include the word "the" in the title, including one episode that is simply titled "The".

Season Two is the last season to feature cold openings with Dr. Weird and Steve. After "The Cloning", Dr. Weird and Steve do not return until the 2007 movie, Aqua Teen Hunger Force Colon Movie Film for Theaters. After the movie, the only mention of them is a non-speaking cameo of Dr. Weird in the season seven episode,  "One Hundred", and later makes his final appearance in season eight episode "Allen Part One". Steve is accompanied with Dr. Weird in "Allen Part One", and makes a non-speaking cameo in the season intro, but is never seen following "Last Dance for Napkin Lad."

Cast

In season two, the main cast consisted of Dana Snyder who provided the voice of Master Shake, Carey Means who provided the voice of Frylock, and series co-creator Dave Willis who provided the voice of both Meatwad and Carl Brutananadilewski; and recurring character Ignignokt. Season two also featured appearances from recurring voice cast members such as C. Martin Croker who voiced both Dr. Weird and Steve in the cold openings, Matt Maiellaro who voiced Err and Cybernetic Ghost of Christmas Past from the Future, George Lowe who voiced himself as various characters MC Chris who voiced McPee Pants, Andy Merrill who voiced Oglethorpe and Merle, and Mike Schatz who voiced Emory. 

Season two also featured many guest appearances. Jon Glaser voiced Ogg in "Super Computer" and "The Last One" and Jerry in "The Broodwich", Brooks Braselman voiced Travis of the Cosmos in "Super Spore" and "The Last One", Ned Hastings, Seth MacFarlane as Wayne 'The Main Brain' McClane in "Super Triva", Zakk Wylde voiced the co-writer to Master Shake's song in "Spirit Journey Formation Anniversary", Tom Scharpling voiced Willie Nelson in "The Shaving", H. Jon Benjamin voiced Mr. Sticks in the Broodwich and reprised his role as Mothmonsterman in "The Last One", Isaac Hayes III was the voice in "The Broodwich" and "The Last One", in "The Cubing" and "The Last One" Jon Schnepp voiced the first Wisdom Cube and Brian Posehn voiced the second Wisdom Cube, Patton Oswalt voiced D.P. and Skeeter in "Frat Aliens" and "The Last One", Barry Mills voiced the turkey in "The Dressing", Ned Hastings and Jay Edwards made voice cameos of themselves in "The", and Scott Hilley voiced George Washington made out of money in "The Cloning". In "The Last One". Several guest stars from season one returned and reprised their roles: David Cross voiced Happy Time Harry, Todd Barry voice Romulux, Todd Field voiced Ol' Drippy, MC Chris voiced MC Pee Pants (who eventually came back in the form of a cow named Sir Loin, and an old man as Little Brittle),  and Matt Harrigan voiced Major Shake.

Episodes

Home release

The first eleven episodes from season two were released on the Aqua Teen Hunger Force Volume Two DVD on July 20, 2004, along with two final episodes from season one. The remaining episodes were released on the Aqua Teen Hunger Force Volume Three DVD on November 16, 2004. Both sets were distributed by Adult Swim and Warner Home Video and feature various special features including the Space Ghost Coast to Coast episode "Baffler Meal", which introduced early rough-cut versions of the main characters on the Volume Two set, and commentaries and deleted scenes on select episodes on both sets. Both sets were later released in Region 4 by Madman Entertainment on November 7, 2007, and August 6, 2008, respectively. In Region 2 the Volume Two set was released on December 7, 2009, and the Volume Three set was released on January 25, 2010 The Volume Two set was also released as part of the Adult Swim in a Box set on October 27, 2009.

Season two is also available on iTunes and the Xbox Live Marketplace. The second half of the seasons' release on iTunes and Xbox Live is labeled as season three. This season was also released on Amazon Video, in two parts under the labels "Volume Two" and "Volume Three".

See also
 List of Aqua Teen Hunger Force episodes
 Aqua Teen Hunger Force

References

External links

 Aqua Teen Hunger Force at Adult Swim
 Aqua Teen Hunger Force season 2 at the Internet Movie Database

2003 American television seasons
Aqua Teen Hunger Force seasons